Katsuragi was a historical place name of Nara. It can also mean:

 Mount Yamato Katsuragi, a mountain in Gose, Nara Prefecture, Japan.
 Katsuragi City in Nara.
 Katsuragi, a town in Wakayama.
 The , in the late 19th century and early 20th century.
 , the lead ship of that class.
 Misato Katsuragi, an anime character named for the aircraft carrier.
 Colonel Katsuragi, a character dubbed by Kazuya Nakai in the anime 07-Ghost.
 Katsuragi Yuki is a Japanese rock singer
 Katsuragi, a character from Senran Kagura.
 Yako Katsuragi, the main character from Neuro: Supernatural Detective
 Takumi Katsuragi, the titular protagonist of Kamen Rider Build who goes by the name Sento Kiryu.

Japanese-language surnames